KJCK (1420 AM) is a radio station broadcasting a classic hits format and is licensed to Junction City, Kansas, United States. The station is currently owned by Eagle Communications, and previously featured programming from ABC Radio, Sporting News Radio and Westwood One.

History

KJCK signed on May 15, 1949, to serve the Salina-Manhattan area.

Expanded Band assignment

On March 17, 1997, the Federal Communications Commission (FCC) announced that eighty-eight stations had been given permission to move to newly available "Expanded Band" transmitting frequencies, ranging from 1610 to 1700 kHz, with KJCK authorized to move from 1420 to 1680 kHz. However, the station never procured the Construction Permit needed to implement the authorization, so the expanded band station was never built.

Later history

For many years, this station carried a country music format, and would later flip to a news/talk format. Prior to the mid-1970s, the station simulcasted with its sister FM station.

On October 6, 2011, Platinum Broadcasting announced it was ceasing operations, and that the station, along with its sister stations, would be sold to Hays-based Eagle Communications, pending FCC approval. The sale was approved on December 15, 2011.

After stunting with Christmas music, on December 27, 2018, KJCK flipped to classic hits, and began emphasizing their translator K300DN (107.9 FM).

References

External links

FCC History Cards for KJCK (covering 1948–1980)

JCK
Classic hits radio stations in the United States